Journey to Shiloh is a 1968 American Western film directed by William Hale and starring James Caan, Michael Sarrazin and Brenda Scott. The film is based on the 1960 novel of the same name by Will Henry first published in 1960.

Plot

Seven young Texans in the Confederate army during the American Civil War, The Concho County Comanches, journey to Shiloh, Tennessee where a major battle is about to take place. Along the way they encounter many perilous adventures.

J.C. decides he no longer wants to follow Buck and takes his money and leaves. Buck finds him just as he is shot and killed by card sharks. Buck rejoins the remaining five and takes a stage to Shreveport, LA, on the way picking up a run-away slave. Out of duty they deliver him to the next town's sheriff, only to see him hung on the road out of town, despite promises he would be returned to his owner.

In Shreveport Buck meets and makes love to Gabrielle DuPrey, but leaves her to lead his men to join the Confederate Army in Richmond, VA.

After being forced to join Braxton Bragg's army and joining the Battle of Shiloh, Little Bit Lucket dies of disease. Todo dies gutshot, Eubie Bell dies in a mortar attack and Willie Bill is shot in the head - all but Miller and Buck are killed in the battle or die of wounds. Miller deserts and is shot by a bounty hunter and dies with Buck by his side, trapped in a barn with the army closing in on them. Before Miller dies, he encourages Buck to leave the army, go get the girl he met in Shreveport and return to Texas.

Sgt. Barnes, who had befriended the Texans, convinces Gen. Bragg to allow Buck to return alone back to Texas instead of being shot as a deserter, the last survivor of the seven who set out for Richmond.

Cast
 James Caan as Buck Burnett
 Michael Sarrazin as Miller Nalls
 Brenda Scott as Gabrielle DuPrey
 Don Stroud as Todo McLean
 Paul Petersen as J.C. Sutton
 Michael Burns as Eubie Bell
 Jan-Michael Vincent as Little Bit Lucket (as Michael Vincent)
 Harrison Ford as Willie Bill Bearden
 John Doucette as General Braxton Bragg
 Noah Beery Jr. as Sgt. Mercer Barnes (as Noah Beery)
 Tisha Sterling as Airybelle Sumner
 James Gammon as Tellis Yeager
 Brian Avery as Carter Claiborne
 Clarke Gordon as Colonel Mirabeau Cooney
 Robert Pine as Collins
 Sean Kennedy as Curtis Claiborne
 Wesley Lau as Colonel Boykin
 Chet Stratton as Mr. Claiborne
 Bing Russell as Greybeard
 Lane Bradford as Case Pettibone
 Rex Ingram as Jacob
 Myron Healey as Sheriff Briggs
 Eileen Wesson as Ella Newsome
 Albert Popwell as Samuel

Reception

Critical reception
TV Guide gave it a negative review, scoring it 2/5, and finding it too talky despite a small number of good action scenes; they also found attempts to establish parallels to the Vietnam War did not work.
Filmink magazine said "the only interesting thing about the film, which stinks of cheap TV and dodgy craft, is that cast and Caan’s terrible wig."

See also
List of American films of 1968

References

External links
 
 
 
 
 

1968 films
1960s English-language films
American war films
1968 Western (genre) films
American Western (genre) films
Universal Pictures films
Films based on works by Henry Wilson Allen
American Civil War films
Films set in Tennessee
Films based on American novels
Films directed by William Hale (director)
1960s American films